Beit Lahia (or Beit Lahya)   is a village situated in the Rashaya District and south of the Beqaa Governorate in Lebanon. It is located near Mount Hermon and the Syrian border, not far from Rashaya, Aaiha and Kfar Qouq.

History
In 1838, Eli Smith noted  Beit Lehya's population as being Druze, "Greek" Christians and Maronite.

References

Bibliography

 

Populated places in Rashaya District